Cordelia is a genus of hairstreak butterflies in the family Lycaenidae. The species are endemic to temperate China.

Species 
 Cordelia comes Leech, 1890 China
 C. c. wilemaniella (Matsumura, 1919 (1929?)) Taïwan
 C. c. koizumii Koiwaya, 1996
 Cordelia kitawakii Koiwaya, 1996 = Pseudogonerilia kitawakii  China (Sichuan, Dabashan)
 Cordelia minerva (Leech, 1890) China
 C. m. jinfoshanensis Koiwaya, 2000

References

Theclini
Lycaenidae genera